A foothill is a hill at the base of a mountain or mountain range.

Foothill or foothills may also refer to:

Places
Foothill, Salt Lake City, a neighborhood of East Bench, Utah
Foothills, Alberta, a locality in Yellowhead County
Foothills (North Carolina), a region between the Piedmont Plateau and the Appalachians
Foothills County, a municipal district in Alberta

Roads
Foothill Boulevard (Southern California), a major road in Los Angeles
Foothill Drive, also called Foothill Boulevard, in Salt Lake City, Utah
Foothill Expressway, County Route G5 in Santa Clara County, California
Foothill Road, a state highway in Douglas County, Nevada
Foothill Toll Road, a state highway in Orange County, California

Other uses
Foothill College, a public community college in Los Altos Hills, California
Foothill Extension, a light rail line in Los Angeles
Foothill Farm, a historic farmhouse in Dublin, New Hampshire
Foothill Malls, a series of traffic medians in Queens, New York
Foothill Observatory, an astronomical observatory in Los Altos Hills, California
Foothill Productions, an American film company
Foothills (album), a 2020 album by The Bats
"Foothills" (song), a 2006 song by Violent Femmes
Foothills Bank, a division of Glacier Bancorp
Foothills Park, a nature preserve in Palo Alto, California
Foothills Parkway, a national parkway in the Great Smoky Mountains, Tennessee
Foothills Stadium, a stadium in Calgary, Alberta
Foothills Trail, a National Recreation Trail in the Carolinas, United States

See also
Foothills Academy (disambiguation)
Foothill Elementary School (disambiguation)
Foothill High School (disambiguation)
Foothills Mall (disambiguation)